Imotica is a village in Dubrovnik-Neretva County on the Dubrovnik Coast, population 122 (2011).

Notable people 
 Pero Miscovich - chief of Water Supply Dubrovnik, Mato Miscovich brother
 Andro Vlahušić - Croatian politician
 Peter Miscovich - great inventor, brother of Pero Miscovich's grandfather
 John Miscovich - (Imotica origin) inventor of Intelligiant water cannon, cousin of Pero Miscovich's father
 Mato Miscovich - chief of hydropower plant HEP Dubrovnik, Pero Miscovich brother

References

Populated places in Dubrovnik-Neretva County
Populated coastal places in Croatia